In phonetics, palatalization (also ) or palatization is a way of pronouncing a consonant in which part of the tongue is moved close to the hard palate. Consonants pronounced this way are said to be palatalized and are transcribed in the International Phonetic Alphabet by affixing the letter ⟨ʲ⟩ to the base consonant. Palatalization cannot minimally distinguish words in most dialects of English, but it may do so in languages such as Russian, Mandarin, and Irish.

Types
In technical terms, palatalization refers to the secondary articulation of consonants by which the body of the tongue is raised toward the hard palate and the alveolar ridge during the articulation of the consonant. Such consonants are phonetically palatalized. "Pure" palatalization is a modification to the articulation of a consonant, where the middle of the tongue is raised, and nothing else.

Phonetically palatalized consonants may vary in their exact realization. Some languages add semivowels before or after the palatalized consonant (onglides or offglides). Typically, the vowel (especially a non-front vowel) following a palatalized consonant has a palatal onglide. In Hupa, on the other hand, the palatalization is heard as both an onglide and an offglide. In some cases, the realization of palatalization may change without any corresponding phonemic change.

In a few languages, including Skolt Sami and many of the Central Chadic languages, palatalization is a suprasegmental feature that affects the pronunciation of an entire syllable, and it may cause certain vowels to be pronounced more front and consonants to be slightly palatalized. In Skolt Sami and its relatives (Kildin Sami and Ter Sami), suprasegmental palatalization contrasts with segmental palatal articulation (palatal consonants).

Transcription
In the International Phonetic Alphabet (IPA), palatalized consonants are marked by the modifier letter , a superscript version of the symbol for the palatal approximant . For instance,  represents the palatalized form of the voiceless alveolar stop . The Uralic Phonetic Alphabet marks palatalized consonants by an acute accent, as do some Finnic languages using the Latin alphabet, as in Võro . Others use an apostrophe, as in Karelian ; or digraphs in j, as in the Savonian dialects of Finnish, .

Phonology
Palatalization has varying phonological significance in different languages. It is allophonic in English, but phonemic in others. In English, consonants are palatalized when they occur before front vowels or the palatal approximant, but no words are distinguished by palatalization (complementary distribution), whereas in some of the other languages, the difference between palatalized consonants and plain un-palatalized consonants distinguish between words, appearing in a contrastive distribution (where one of the two versions palatalized or not, appears in the same environment as the other).

Allophonic palatalization 
In some languages, like English, palatalization is allophonic. Some phonemes have palatalized allophones in certain contexts, typically before front vowels and unpalatalized allophones elsewhere. Because it is allophonic, palatalization of this type does not distinguish words and often goes unnoticed by native speakers. Phonetic palatalization occurs in American English. Stops are palatalized before the front vowel  and not palatalized in other cases.

Phonemic palatalization 
In some languages, palatalization is a distinctive feature that distinguishes two consonant phonemes. This feature occurs in Russian, Irish, and Scottish Gaelic, among others.

Phonemic palatalization may be contrasted with either plain or velarized articulation. In many of the Slavic languages, and some of the Baltic and Finnic languages, palatalized consonants contrast with plain consonants, but in Irish they contrast with velarized consonants.
 Russian   "nose" (unpalatalized )
   "(he) carried" (palatalized )
 Irish   "cow" (velarized b)
   "alive" (palatalized b)

Some palatalized phonemes undergo change beyond phonetic palatalization. For instance, the unpalatalized sibilant (Irish , Scottish ) has a palatalized counterpart that is actually postalveolar , not phonetically palatalized , and the velar fricative  in both languages has a palatalized counterpart that is actually palatal  rather than palatalized velar . These shifts in primary place of articulation are examples of the sound change of palatalization.

Morphophonemic

In some languages, palatalization is used as a morpheme or part of a morpheme. In some cases, a vowel caused a consonant to become palatalized, and then this vowel was lost by elision. Here, there appears to be a phonemic contrast when analysis of the deep structure shows it to be allophonic.

In Romanian, consonants are palatalized before . Palatalized consonants appear at the end of the word, and mark the plural in nouns and adjectives, and the second person singular in verbs. The interpretation commonly taken, however, is that an underlying morpheme  palatalizes the consonant and is subsequently deleted.

Palatalization may also occur as a morphological feature.  For example, although Russian makes phonemic contrasts between palatalized and unpalatalized consonants, alternations across morpheme boundaries are normal:
   ('answer') vs.   ('to answer')
   ('[I] carry') vs.   ('carries')
   ('hunger') vs.   ('hungry' masc.)

Sound changes

In some languages, allophonic palatalization developed into phonemic palatalization by phonemic split. In other languages, phonemes that were originally phonetically palatalized changed further: palatal secondary place of articulation developed into changes in manner of articulation or primary place of articulation.

Phonetic palatalization of a consonant sometimes causes surrounding vowels to change by coarticulation or assimilation. See  for more information.

Examples

Slavic languages
In many Slavic languages, palatal or palatalized consonants are called soft, and others are called hard. Some of them, like Russian, have numerous pairs of palatalized and unpalatalized consonant phonemes. 

Russian Cyrillic has pairs of vowel letters that mark whether the consonant preceding them is hard/soft:
/,
/,
/,
/, and
/.
The otherwise silent soft sign  also indicates that the previous consonant is soft.

Goidelic

Irish and Scottish Gaelic have pairs of palatalized (slender) and unpalatalized (broad) consonant phonemes. In Irish, most broad consonants are velarized.

Mandarin Chinese

Marshallese
In the Marshallese language, each consonant has some type of secondary articulation (palatalization, velarization, or labiovelarization). The palatalized consonants are regarded as "light", and the velarized and rounded consonants are regarded as "heavy", with the rounded consonants being both velarized and labialized.

Norwegian
Many Norwegian dialects have phonemic palatalized consonants. In many parts of Northern Norway and many areas of Møre og Romsdal, for example, the words  ('hand') and /hɑnʲː/ ('he') are differentiated only by the palatalization of the final consonant. Palatalization is generally realised only on stressed syllables, but speakers of the Sør-Trøndelag dialects will generally palatalize the coda of a determined plural as well: e.g.  or, in other areas,  ('the dogs'), rather than *.

See also 
 Iotation, a related process in Slavic languages
 Soft sign, a Cyrillic grapheme indicating palatalization
 Manner of articulation
 List of phonetics topics
 Labio-palatalization
 Yōon

References

Bibliography
 Bynon, Theodora. Historical Linguistics. Cambridge University Press, 1977.
 
 
 
 Crowley, Terry. (1997) An Introduction to Historical Linguistics. 3rd edition. Oxford University Press.

External links
 Erkki Savolainen, Internetix 1998. Suomen murteet – Koprinan murretta. (with a sound sample with palatalized t')
 Frisian assibilation as a hypercorrect effect due to a substrate language

Phonetics
Palatal consonants
Secondary articulation